Xiangfu District, formerly Kaifeng County, is a district of the city of Kaifeng, Henan, China.

Administrative divisions
As 2012, this district is divided to 6 towns and 9 townships.
Towns

Townships

References

County-level divisions of Henan